Giovanni Agostino Ratti (1699–1755) was an Italian painter of the late-Baroque period.

Biography
Born in Savona, and active in Genoa, he constructed scenography for the theatre, and cabinets with lively caricatures, which he also engraved. He was clever in church paintings, as may be seen in the church of San Giovanni at Savona, where, besides other subjects of St John the Baptist, there is a much-praised Decollation. He also painted in the church of Santa Teresa in Genoa, and was a follower of Benedetto Luti, whose school he had frequented when in Rome. He was also a good fresco-painter; his works are in the choir of the Conventual church in Casale Monferrato, where he added figures to the quadratura of Giuseppe Natali. But subjects of humor were his forte. In these, he had an exhaustless fancy, fertile and ever-creative. Nothing can be more amusing than his masks, representing quarrels, dances, and such scenes as form the subjects of comedy. Giovanni's son, Carlo Giuseppe Ratti, was an artist and art biographer.

References

1699 births
1755 deaths
18th-century Italian painters
Italian male painters
Painters from Genoa
Italian Baroque painters
Italian scenic designers
18th-century Italian male artists